Monuments Uncovered is the tenth studio album of the German power metal band Mystic Prophecy. It was released by Massacre Records on the 12th of January 2018 and contains 11 metal cover tracks of famous rock hits primarily from the 70s & 80s with the exception of "Are You Gonna Go My Way" and "Space Lord" releasing from the 90s.

Track listing 

 You Keep Me Hangin' On (Kim Wilde/The Supremes cover)
 Hot Stuff (Donna Summer cover)
 Shadow On The Wall (Mike Oldfield cover)
 Are You Gonna Go My Way (Lenny Kravitz cover)
 I'm Still Standing (Elton John cover)
 Because The Night (Patti Smith cover)
 Space Lord (Monster Magnet cover)
 Get It On (T.Rex cover)
 Tokyo (At Vance cover)
 Proud Mary (Creedence Clearwater Revival cover)
 The Stroke (Billy Squier cover) (digipak bonus track)

Credits 
 Roberto Dimitri Liapakis - vocals
 Markus Pohl - Guitars 
 Joey Roxx - Bass
 Hanno Kerstan - Drums  
 Evan K - Guitars

 Produced by R.D.Liapakis
 Mixed by Fredrik Nordström
 Mastered by Christian Schmid & R.D.Liapakis
 Recorded at Prophecy & Music Factory Studios (Germany)
 Sound Engineer Christian Schmid
 Cover Art & General Artwork by Uwe Jarling
 Artwork & Layout Design by Anestis Goudas
 Band Photos by Peter Roth.

References

Source: Official Mystic Prophecy-homepage

2018 albums
Mystic Prophecy albums
Massacre Records albums